Mughanly (also, Karkar-Mughanlysy) is a village and municipality in the Aghjabadi of Azerbaijan.  It has a population of 1,510.

References 

Populated places in Aghjabadi District